The Fuller House, also known as the Fuller Residence, in Syracuse, New York was designed by Ward Wellington Ward.  Along with other homes he designed, it was listed on the National Register of Historic Places in 1997.

The house includes Craftsman architectural style elements.

It is located directly across Salt Springs Road from the Harry N. Burhans House, a house that was substantially revised by Ward.

References

Houses in Syracuse, New York
National Register of Historic Places in Syracuse, New York
Houses on the National Register of Historic Places in New York (state)
Bungalow architecture in New York (state)
American Craftsman architecture in New York (state)
Houses completed in 1911